Heon may refer to:

People
 Georges Héon (1902–1965), Canadian politician
 Jo Heon (1544–1592), Korean militia leader

Places
 Heon, SBS Nagar, India

Korean names
 Heon can appear in Korean names: